The James Bevan Trophy is a rugby union trophy which was created in 2007, and named after James Bevan, the Welsh Australian who was the first ever captain of the Wales rugby union team in 1881. The trophy was established after a decision on 10 May 2007 by the Welsh and Australian rugby unions to celebrate the 100 years of Test rugby between the two sides. Australia are the current holders.

The Trophy was commissioned by International Business Wales, the economic arm of the Welsh assembly government.

Trophy history
Australia snatched victory in the inaugural James Bevan Trophy test match 29–23 with a last minute try on Saturday 26 May 2007 at the Telstra Stadium in Sydney. They followed this up with a whitewash 31–0 victory at the Suncorp Stadium in Brisbane.

Wales captured the trophy the following year in 2008 with a 21–18 victory in Cardiff, but since then it has remained in Australian hands. Three victories in Cardiff in 2009–11 were followed up by a 3–0 series win in Australia in 2012, all by narrow margins. In the return match in Cardiff, Australia once again won with a last minute try.

The 2011 Rugby World Cup brought Australia and Wales together again for a third place play-off and once again it was a close finish with Australia claiming third place in a reversal of the first World Cup in 1987 when Wales won the play-off 22–21.

In three previous trophy matches Wales were leading, only for Australia to score the winning points in the 80th, 74th and 79th minute. Wales ended a run of thirteen consecutive defeats against Australia on 10 November 2018, narrowly winning 9-6.They retained the Trophy in Cardiff. Wales on 20 November 2021 29-28.

Matches

Results
 – Summer Test
 – Autumn International

See also

History of rugby union matches between Australia and Wales

References

External links

History of rugby union matches between Australia and Wales
Rugby union international rivalry trophies
International rugby union competitions hosted by Australia
International rugby union competitions hosted by Wales
2007 establishments in Australia
2007 establishments in Wales